Thomas Anthony Donald Crook (16 February 1920 – 21 January 2014) was a racing driver from England. He was born in Manchester and educated at Clifton College, Bristol. He participated in two Formula 2 Grand Prix races counting towards the World Championship of Drivers, debuting on 19 July 1952.  He scored no championship points. He also participated in several non-championship races.

Crook had a successful career as a racing driver outside of Formula 2 amassing nearly 400 win or place finishes between 1946 and 1955. His career ended after an accident that season, but he had been planning to retire in 1955 anyway. In his capacity as a motor dealer in Surrey Crook specialised in Bristols and became part owner of the Bristol company in 1960, before taking full ownership in 1973. He retained the sole ownership of Bristol Cars until 1997 and part ownership until 2002 but remained with the company until 2007, when he retired.

Racing record

Complete Formula One World Championship results
(key)

References

External links
Profile at grandprix.com
Obituary at Motor Sport magazine archive

1920 births
2014 deaths
English racing drivers
English Formula One drivers
Brighton Speed Trials people
Sportspeople from Manchester